Sweden competed at the 1998 Winter Olympics in Nagano, Japan.

Medalists

Alpine skiing

Men

Men's combined

Women

Women's combined

Biathlon

Men

Men's 4 × 7.5 km relay

Women

Women's 4 × 7.5 km relay

 1 A penalty loop of 150 metres had to be skied per missed target.
 2 One minute added per missed target.

Cross-country skiing

Men

 1 Starting delay based on 10 km results. 
 C = Classical style, F = Freestyle

Men's 4 × 10 km relay

Women

 2 Starting delay based on 5 km results. 
 C = Classical style, F = Freestyle

Women's 4 × 5 km relay

Curling 

Summary

Men's tournament

Group stage
Top four teams advanced to semi-finals.

|}

Tie-breaker

|}

Contestants

Women's tournament

Group stage
Top four teams advanced to semi-finals.

|}

Medal round
Semi-finals

Bronze medal match

Figure skating

Women

Freestyle skiing

Men

Women

Ice hockey

Summary

Men's tournament

First Round - Group C

Quarter-final

Team roster
Johan Hedberg
Tommy Salo
Tommy Söderström
Tommy Albelin
Calle Johansson
Nicklas Lidström
Mattias Norström
Marcus Ragnarsson
Ulf Samuelsson
Mattias Öhlund
Daniel Alfredsson
Mikael Andersson
Ulf Dahlén
Peter Forsberg
Andreas Johansson
Jörgen Jönsson
Patric Kjellberg
Mats Lindgren
Michael Nylander
Mikael Renberg
Tomas Sandström
Mats Sundin
Niklas Sundström
Head coach: Kent Forsberg

Women's tournament
The First 4 teams (shaded green) advanced to medal round games.

|}

Luge

Men

(Men's) Doubles

Short track speed skating

Men

Snowboarding

Men's giant slalom

Men's halfpipe

Women's giant slalom

Women's halfpipe

References
 Olympic Winter Games 1998, full results by sports-reference.com

Nations at the 1998 Winter Olympics
1998
Winter Olympics